Kirill Dmitriyevich Makarov (born 7 January 1987) is a former Russian professional footballer.

Club career
He made his debut in the Russian Premier League in 2006 for FC Luch-Energiya Vladivostok.

References

1987 births
Footballers from Saint Petersburg
Living people
Russian footballers
Association football forwards
FC Zenit-2 Saint Petersburg players
FC Luch Vladivostok players
FC Khimki players
FC Torpedo Moscow players
FC Sokol Saratov players
Russian Premier League players
FC Novokuznetsk players